Route 94, also known as Admirals Beach Road, is a  north-south highway on the Avalon Peninsula of Newfoundland. It connects the communities of Admirals Beach and O'Donnells with Route 90 in the town of St. Joseph's.

Route description

Route 94 begins in Admirals Beach at the Harbour and heads northeast through town before leaving and passing along the coastline of St. Mary's Bay for several kilometres. It now crosses an Inlet via a Causeway before passing through O'Donnells and turning more inland through hilly terrain. The highway now enters St. Joseph's as begins following the Salmonier Arm of St. Mary's Bay and passes through town for a few kilometres before coming to an end at a Y-Intersection with Route 90 (Salmonier Line).

Major intersections

References

094